Sri Krishna Sweets is a popular Indian sweet manufacturer and eatery based in Coimbatore, Tamil Nadu. It is most noted for its Mysorepak.  Sri Krishna Sweets has exclusive outlets in 60 plus locations across the country, and in the UAE. The sumptuous sweets are part of an ever-growing spectrum of pure ghee sweets, milk sweets and syrupy delicacies.

History
Sri Krishna Sweets was established as a restaurant in 1948 in Coimbatore. Its founder was N. K. Mahadeva Iyer who wanted to produce "pure ghee sweets" at home and market them. In 1972, he opened a separate sweet shop at R. S. Puram to retail sweets. As the sweet shop did good business, other branches were opened in different parts of Coimbatore in 1991. In 1996, the company expanded its operations to Chennai and other cities in South India. As of 2010, it has 60 retail outlets across India and three in the United Arab Emirates. It also started serving snacks in its sweet shop and has started providing lunch to customers from 2006. The company is currently managed by Mahadeva Iyer's sons - M. Murali and M. Krishnan.

Gallery

References

External links 
 Official website
 Buy sweets

Indian companies established in 1948
Food and drink companies established in 1948
Privately held companies of India
Companies based in Coimbatore
Confectionery companies of India
Restaurants in Coimbatore
Restaurants established in 1948
Restaurant chains in India
Restaurants in Chennai